Henry Fitch may refer to:

Henry D. Fitch (1799–1849) early settler of San Diego, California
Henry S. Fitch (1909–2009), American herpetologist
Henry Fitch, 19th-century African-American namesake of historic Fitch-Hoose House in Dalton, Massachusetts

See also
Henry Fitch Taylor (1853–1925), American painter